United Nations Security Council Resolution 2035 was unanimously adopted on 17 February 2012.

See also 
List of United Nations Security Council Resolutions 2001 to 2100

References

External links
Text of the Resolution at undocs.org

2012 United Nations Security Council resolutions
United Nations Security Council resolutions concerning Sudan
2012 in Sudan
February 2012 events